Norbert Zeh is a German computer scientist, currently a Canada Research Chair at Dalhousie University.

References

Year of birth missing (living people)
Living people
Academic staff of the Dalhousie University
Canadian computer scientists
Researchers in geometric algorithms
Place of birth missing (living people)